Adesmus facetus is a species of beetle in the family Cerambycidae. It was described by Martins and Galileo in 2008. It is known from Brazil.

References

Adesmus
Beetles described in 2008